739 Naval Air Squadron (739 NAS) was a Naval Air Squadron of the Royal Navy's Fleet Air Arm. It was formed as the Blind Approach Development Unit for the Fleet Air Arm, operating with Fulmar and Swordfish aircraft, at RNAS Lee-on-Solent (HMS Daedalus), in 1942. Just under one year later the squadron moved to RNAS Worthy Down (HMS Kestrel), in late 1943 and continued in the role. Roughly one year later the squadron moved again, relocating to RNAS Donibristle (HMS Merlin) in late 1944, disbanding in 1945. From 1947 it was based at RNAS Culham, with a new role, as a Fleet Air Arm Photographic Trials and Development Unit.

History of 739 NAS

Blind Approach Development Unit (1942 - 1947)
739 Naval Air Squadron formed at RNAS Lee-on-Solent (HMS Daedalus), situated near Lee-on-the-Solent in Hampshire, approximately four miles west of Portsmouth, on the 15 December 1942, as the Blind Approach Development Unit. It was initially equipped with Fairey Swordfish and Fairey Fulmar aircraft. It remained at Worthy Down for around one year before moving again.

Photographic Trials and Development Unit (1947 - 1950)
On 1 May 1947 739 Naval Air Squadron reformed to become the RN Photographic Trials and Development Unit, based at RNAS Culham (HMS Hornbill), located near Culham, Oxfordshire, (it had originally been intended to share the RAF's PR resources at RAF Benson, which became overcrowded). The squadron operated Sea Mosquito & Sea Hornet aircraft in this role, until finally disbanding on 12 July 1950

Aircraft flown

The squadron has flown a number of different aircraft types, including:
Airspeed Oxford
Avro Anson
Beech Expediter II
Fairey Swordfish I
Fairey Swordfish II
Sea Mosquito T.R.33
de Havilland Hornet F.20
de Havilland Hornet P.R.22

Fleet Air Arm Bases 
739 NAS operated from a number of air bases:
Royal Naval Air Station LEE-ON-SOLENT (15 December 1942 - 14 September 1943)
Royal Naval Air Station WORTHY DOWN (14 September 1943 - 5 October 1944)
Royal Naval Air Station DONIBRISTLE (5 October 1944 - 1 May 1947)
Royal Naval Air Station CULHAM (1 May 1947 - 12 July 1950)

References

Citations

Bibliography

700 series Fleet Air Arm squadrons
Military units and formations established in 1942
Military units and formations of the Royal Navy in World War II